An'treyon "Trey" Sermon (born January 30, 1999) is an American football running back for the Philadelphia Eagles of the National Football League (NFL). He played college football at Oklahoma and Ohio State and was drafted by the San Francisco 49ers in the third round of the 2021 NFL Draft.

Early years
Sermon attended Sprayberry High School in Marietta, Georgia. He committed to the University of Oklahoma to play college football.

College career

Oklahoma
As a true freshman at Oklahoma in 2017, Sermon played in all 14 games and made three starts. He finished the season with 744 yards on 121 carries with five touchdowns. As a sophomore in 2018, he shared time with Kennedy Brooks, rushing for 947 yards on 164 carries and 13 touchdowns. As a junior in 2019, he played in nine games and had 54 carries for 385 yards and four touchdowns.

Ohio State
Sermon transferred to Ohio State University as a graduate student in 2020. In the 2020 Big Ten Championship Game against Northwestern University, Sermon's 331 rushing yards were the most in a single game by an Ohio State player and the highest ever in a Football Bowl Subdivision championship game. He was the game's MVP. In the 2021 Sugar Bowl versus Clemson, Sermon rushed for 193 yards and scored a rushing touchdown along with catching 4 passes for 61 yards in a 49-28 victory. In the 2021 National Championship Game against Alabama, Sermon got injured on the first play of the game and did not return.

Statistics

Professional career

San Francisco 49ers
Sermon was drafted by the San Francisco 49ers in the third round (88th overall) of the 2021 NFL Draft. He signed his four-year rookie contract on July 21, 2021.

Sermon entered his rookie season in 2021 as the third-string running back behind Raheem Mostert and fellow rookie Elijah Mitchell. He made his first career start in Week 3, where he rushed for 31 yards and a touchdown with two catches for three yards and another touchdown. He suffered an ankle injury in Week 12 and was placed on injured reserve on December 4, 2021. He was activated on January 11, 2022.

Sermon was released by the 49ers on August 31, 2022.

Philadelphia Eagles
On September 1, 2022, Sermon was claimed off waivers by the Philadelphia Eagles.

References

External links
Phildelphia Eagles bio
Ohio State Buckeyes bio
Oklahoma Sooners bio

1999 births
Living people
American football running backs
Ohio State Buckeyes football players
Oklahoma Sooners football players
Philadelphia Eagles players
Players of American football from Marietta, Georgia
San Francisco 49ers players